Diana Ponti, also known as Lavinia Ponti (d. circa 1615), was an Italian stage actress.

She was the daughter of the actor Adriano Valerini. Diana Ponti was the managing actor-director (or capocomico) of the company I Desiosi, which was also called Diana Comica Dediosa after her. The exact years are not known but she is confirmed as such in 1585–1588 and would have retired as such prior to 1597, when Flaminio Scala is noted as manager. The position as manager of a company was not common in the 16th-century and she would have been a pioneer in Europe in this aspect. She enjoyed fame and popularity and was a well-noted actor of her day in contemporary Italy. She was also active as a poet.

References

 Pierre Louis Duchartre: The Italian Comedy
 Oliver Crick, John Rudlin: Commedia Dell'Arte: A Handbook for Troupes
 Emily Wilbourne:Seventeenth-Century Opera and the Sound of the Commedia dell’Arte

16th-century births
Year of death unknown
Commedia dell'arte
16th-century Italian actresses
16th-century theatre managers
Women theatre managers and producers
16th-century Italian poets
17th-century Italian actresses
Italian stage actresses
16th-century Italian businesswomen